The Sant'Emidio Red Temple (Tempietto Sant'Emidio Rosso) is a church of Ascoli Piceno in Italy.  Its name refers to Saint Emygdius (Emidius), patron saint of the city.

References 

Emidio Rosso
Octagonal churches in Italy
Renaissance architecture in le Marche